Johnny Baldwin (born April 1, 1984) is a former professional American and Canadian football linebacker. He was drafted by the Detroit Lions in the fifth round of the 2007 NFL Draft. He played college football at Alabama A&M.

Baldwin was also a member of the Kansas City Chiefs, Washington Redskins, Winnipeg Blue Bombers, and California Redwoods.

Early years
Baldwin attended McAdory High School in McCalla, Alabama and was a student and a standout in football. In football, he played linebacker and as a senior, he was an All-Area selection and an All-District selection.

External links
Just Sports Stats

1984 births
Living people
American football linebackers
Canadian football linebackers
American players of Canadian football
African-American players of Canadian football
Alabama A&M Bulldogs football players
Detroit Lions players
Kansas City Chiefs players
Players of American football from Alabama
Washington Redskins players
Winnipeg Blue Bombers players
Sacramento Mountain Lions players
Sportspeople from Bessemer, Alabama
21st-century African-American sportspeople
20th-century African-American people
Players of Canadian football from Alabama